Twenty+ is the eighth studio album by All-4-One.

It was released on July 24, 2015 through AFO LTD / Heavyweights Entertainment. It is a celebration of the group's 20th anniversary featuring new material as well as new versions of their biggest hits, and features Rob Young, Shanice Wilson and Debelah Morgan.

The first single from the album was "Baby Love" which premiered on June 2, 2015 through Billboard. The follow-up single "Now That We're Together" was released on May 24, 2016.

Track listing 
"Goin' Crazy"
"Baby Love"
"Chariots"
"Life at All"
"Say What You Want To"
"If We Fall"
"Now That We're Together"
"Save It All 4 Me"
"What Goes Up"
"Who Do You Love" (feat. Rob Young)
"Lose It"
"Smile"
"I Won't Let You Down"
"Go to Bed" (feat. Shanice Wilson & Debelah Morgan)
"I Swear" (New Version)
"I Can Love You Like That" (New Version)
"So Much in Love" (New Version)
"Someday" (New Version)
"(She's Got) Skillz" (New Version)
"I Turn to You" (New Version)
"Beautiful as U" (New Version) (Deluxe Version Bonus Track)
"She Believes in Me" (Deluxe Version Bonus Track)
"I Swear" (feat. John Michael Montgomery) (Deluxe Version Bonus Track)

References 

2015 albums
All-4-One albums